The State Institute of Engineering & Technology, Nilokheri (formerly Government Engineering College, Nilokheri (Hindi : राजकीय अभियांत्रिकी एवं प्रौद्योगिकी संस्थान, निलोखेड़ी, abbreviated SIETN) is a public government engineering institution in Nilokheri. It is one of the four engineering colleges run by the Government of Haryana, the others being Ch. Devi Lal State Institute of Engineering & Technology, Sirsa, Rao Bijender Singh State Institute of Engineering & Technology, Rewari, and Ch. Ranbir Singh State Institute of Engineering & Technology, Jhajjar.

History
The concept of the diploma institute at Nilokheri as an engineering college was first introduced in year 2000. After many initial tries, college was supposed to open in 2010 but due to government and political policy, idea was rejected once again. The institute building was previously used by the students of Govt. Polytechnic Nilokheri was granted the status of engineering college in 2016 having named Government Engineering College, Nilokheri which was later changed to State Institute of Engineering & Technology, Nilokheri. The institute was inaugurated by Manohar Lal Khattar, who was the Chief Minister of Haryana. The Guru BrahmaNand Ji Govt. Polytechnic Nilokheri (GBNGPN) formerly known as the Govt. Polytechnic Nilokheri (GPN)'s classes of Diploma Ist year were shifted out en-block to mark the beginning of SIET Nilokheri at its campus in new building. The Guru BrahmaNand Ji Govt. Polytechnic Nilokheri  (GBNGPN) is thus the mother institution of GEC Nilokheri. The institution have best record in placements of 2021 and 2020 batch. Up to 70% of CSE branch students were placed in multinational corporations like TCS, NIIT, etc. Students of this institution are interested in open source development, competitive programming, data structure and algorithms, machine learning, artificial intelligence, etc.

Recognition 
State Institute of Engineering & Technology, Nilokheri is affiliated to Kurukshetra University and is approved by All India Council of Technical Education, New Delhi (AICTE) and the Department of Technical Education, Govt. of Haryana (DTE).

Admissions
Admission in B.Tech first year is given to students on the basis of their ranks in Joint Entrance Examination-Main. Admission in second year though B.Tech Lateral Entry scheme is done on basis of B.E./B.Tech Lateral Engineering Entrance Test exam conducted by Haryana State Technical Education Society.

Departments
Computer Science & Engineering
Civil Engineering
Electronics & Communication Engineering
Mechanical Engineering
Applied Science

Academic programs 
State Institute of Engineering & Technology, Nilokheri awards undergraduate B.Tech in various engineering fields in a four-year Engineering programme. College is expected to start Masters (M.tech) from coming session 2022-23 onwards. As per the information available, Mtech will be offered by Computer science engineering and Mechanical engineering department respectively.

National Service Scheme and NCC
This institute also has National Service Scheme for better development of students enriching their overall personality.

NCC has been introduced in the college from 21-22 session onwards.

Campus
The institute is in Nilokheri, district Karnal, Haryana. It is well connected by road and railway having Nilokheri railway station. The campus is also close to other educational, training and research institutions such as the Govt. Polytechnic Nilokheri, Central Tool Room Extension Center, Nilokheri, National Dairy Research Institute, University Institute of Engineering and Technology, Kurukshetra University, National Institute of Technology, Kurukshetra, Govt. Polytechnic, Umri, National Institute of Design, Kurukshetra, National Institute of Electronics & Information Technology, Kurukshetra and Kalpana Chawla Government Medical College.

See also
 AICTE (AICTE)
 Association of Indian Universities (AIU)
 Education in India
 List of institutions of higher education in Haryana
 List of universities in India
 National Assessment and Accreditation Council (NAAC)
 Universities and colleges in India

References

External links

HSBTE RESULTS

Engineering colleges in Haryana
Education in Karnal
All India Council for Technical Education
Educational institutions established in 2016
2016 establishments in Haryana
Kurukshetra University
Government universities and colleges in India
Nilokheri